Alvie is a small town in Victoria, Australia. It is located along Baynes Road, in the Colac Otway Shire, north-west of Colac. It was named after a Scottish town of the same name, which was the birthplace of James Macpherson Grant, the Minister of Lands. It is situated in what became a rich dairying, potato and onion growing area.

Red Rock Reserve, which incorporates several volcanic craters, is in Alvie. It includes a public lookout.

The local primary school, Alvie Consolidated School, was opened in 1957. It occupies a 15-acre site on Wool Wool Road.
 
A post office at Alvie opened on 27 June 1894 and was closed in 1978. A railway branch line to Alvie from Colac was opened in 1923, mainly to assist the development of soldier settlement in the area after World War I. The line closed in 1954.
  
Alvie Football Netball Club has an Australian rules football and a netball team competing in the Colac & District Football League. The football team, the Swans, has won 12 premierships since World War II.

References

Towns in Victoria (Australia)